The Hungarian Order of Merit is the fourth highest State Order of Hungary.  Founded in 1991, the order is a revival of an original order founded in 1946 and abolished in 1949. Its origins, however, can be traced to the Order of Merit of the Kingdom of Hungary which existed from 1922 until 1946.

In 2011 its official name changed from Order of Merit of the Republic of Hungary to Hungarian Order of Merit in accordance with the new Hungarian Constitution. It is awarded in either civilian or military divisions.

Since 2011, the Hungarian Order of Saint Stephen is the highest State honour of Hungary.

Classes 
The civil division is divided into six classes of merit, whilst the military division is divided into five. The highest class, the Grand Cross with Chain, is exclusive to the civilian division and is only awarded to heads of state and the President of Hungary ex-officio.

Insignia 

 The medal of the Order is made on the features of the ancient Royal Order of Saint Stephen of Hungary: it consists of a white-enamelled cross edged with green, showing a central circular medallion enamelled in red showing the coat of arms of Hungary, surrounded by a wreath of green enamel.
 The star takes up the shape of the medal but is mounted on a golden radiant star.
 The ribbon is green with a red stripe and a white stripe for the civil class, while it is red with a green stripe and a white stripe for the military class.

References

Sources

State Decorations, Office of the President of Hungary
Hungary: Hungarian Order of Merit (Civilian), Medals of the World
 1991 XXXI law enacting the order
 2011 CCII. law enacting the order

 
Merit
Merit of the Republic of Hungary, Order of the
Orders, decorations, and medals
Orders of merit